"Dewey Defeats Truman" was an incorrect banner headline on the front page of the Chicago Daily Tribune (later Chicago Tribune) on November 3, 1948, the day after incumbent United States president Harry S. Truman won an upset victory over his opponent, Governor Thomas E. Dewey of New York, in the 1948 presidential election. It was famously held up by Truman at a stop at St. Louis Union Station following his successful election, smiling triumphantly at the error.

Background
The Chicago Daily Tribune, which had once referred to Democratic candidate Truman as a "nincompoop", was a famously Republican-leaning paper. In a retrospective article some 60 years later about the newspaper's most famous and embarrassing headline, the Tribune wrote that Truman "had as low an opinion of the Tribune as it did of him".

For about a year prior to the 1948 election, the printers who operated the linotype machines at the Chicago Tribune and other Chicago papers had been on strike, in protest of the Taft–Hartley Act. Around the same time, the Tribune had switched to a method by which copy for the paper was composed on typewriters, photographed, and then engraved onto the printing plates. This process required the paper to go to press several hours earlier than usual.

Election of 1948

On election night, this earlier press deadline required the first post-election issue of the Tribune to go to press before states had reported most of the results from the polling places.

The paper relied on its veteran Washington correspondent and political analyst, Arthur Sears Henning, who had predicted the winner in four of the five presidential contests since 1928. As conventional wisdom, supported by various polls, was almost unanimous that Dewey would win the election by a landslide, the first (one-star) edition of the Tribune therefore went to press with the banner headline "DEWEY DEFEATS TRUMAN".

The story by Henning also reported Republicans had retained control of the House of Representatives and the Senate, which would work with President-elect Dewey. Henning wrote that "Dewey and Warren won a sweeping victory in the presidential election yesterday. The early returns showed the Republican ticket leading Truman and Barkley pretty consistently in the western and southern states" and added that "indications were that the complete returns would disclose that Dewey won the presidency by an overwhelming majority of the electoral vote".

As returns began to indicate a close race later in the evening, Henning brushed them off and stuck to his prediction. Thousands of papers continued to roll off the presses with the banner headline predicting a Dewey victory.

Even after the paper's lead story was rewritten to emphasize local elections and to indicate the narrowness of Dewey's lead in the presidential contest, the same banner headline was left on the front page. Only late in the evening, after press dispatches cast doubt upon the certainty of Dewey's victory, did the Tribune change the headline to "DEMOCRATS MAKE SWEEP OF STATE OFFICES" for the later two-star edition. Some 150,000 copies of the paper had already been printed with the erroneous headline before it was corrected.

Truman, as it turned out, won the electoral vote with a 303–189–39 majority over Dewey and Dixiecrat candidate Strom Thurmond, though swings of less than one percent of the popular vote in Ohio, Illinois, and California would have produced a Dewey victory; the same swing in any two of these states would have forced a contingent election in the House of Representatives.

Instead of a Republican sweep of the White House and retention of both houses of Congress, the Democrats retained the White House and took control of the Senate and the House of Representatives.

Aftermath

Two days later, when Truman was passing through St. Louis on the way to Washington, he stepped to the rear platform of his train car, the Ferdinand Magellan, and was handed a copy of the Tribune early edition. Happy to exult in the paper's error, he held it up for the photographers gathered at the station, and the famous picture (in several versions) was taken. Truman reportedly smiled and said, "That ain't the way I heard it!" Henning's obituary in 1966, published in the Tribune, makes no mention of the event.

Tribune publishers could laugh about the blunder years later and had planned to give Truman a plaque with a replica of the erroneous banner headline on the 25th anniversary of the 1948 election. However, Truman died on December 26, 1972, before the gift could be bestowed.

The Tribune was not the only paper to make the mistake. The Journal of Commerce had eight articles in its edition of November 3 about what could be expected of President Dewey. The paper's five-column headline read, "Dewey Victory Seen as Mandate to Open New Era of Government-Business Harmony, Public Confidence".

In popular culture

In the 1992 alternate history anthology Alternate Presidents, the story "The More Things Change..." by Glen E. Cox tells the story of the 1948 election in reverse, with Thomas E. Dewey as the underdog who eventually defeats the early overwhelming favorite, the incumbent Harry S. Truman, by playing to anti-communist fears. Accordingly, the Tribune'''s headline now inaccurately reads "Truman Defeats Dewey". The front cover of the anthology depicts a grinning Dewey proudly holding up the relevant edition of the Tribune in the same manner as Truman did in real life.

The newspaper appeared in the original artwork on the cover of the Rush album Permanent Waves."Lisa's Substitute", a second season episode of The Simpsons, spoofs the incident.

The back of the satirical newspaper The Onion's 1999 book Our Dumb Century, which features fabricated front pages throughout the 20th century, shows the famous photo of Truman, the Tribune front page altered into a fictitious Onion paper with the headline "OTHER GUY DEFEATS WHATS-HIS-FACE."

In Sidney Sheldon's thriller novel The Best Laid Plans, this news article is presented by Leslie Stewart as an example of information gotten wrong by a major newspaper.

The American indie rock band Dewey Defeats Truman is named after the iconic headline.

Similar incidents
This is not the only instance in which the media has declared an incorrect result in an election. This includes newspapers publishing headlines reporting inaccurate projections of election results, and broadcast media announcing inaccurate projections. The following are select examples of this.

The morning following the 1916 United States presidential election the Brown Daily Herald prematurely published the headline "Hughes Elected to Presidency; Republicans Carry Both Houses". This proved to be entirely erroneous, as once the results were fully counted, Democratic incumbent Woodrow Wilson won reelection to the presidency and Democrats won both chambers of the United States Congress.

In the morning after the 1960 United States presidential election, NBC wrongly projected John F. Kennedy as having won the state of California (Richard Nixon would ultimately prove the winner of that state).

In the 2000 United States presidential election, a number of television networks initially made projections on election night that Al Gore had won in the state of Florida, and with it, the presidency, before retracting their projections. Around 2:00 am EST the following morning, a number of networks projected George W. Bush the victor in Florida, before retracting this projection roughly an hour later and declaring the race "too close to call". Bush would ultimately win a narrow victory in the state after a United States Supreme Court decision halted a recount of the state's results.

In the 2016 United States presidential election, following Hillary Clinton's predicted victory, the magazine Newsweek printed copies with Clinton's face alongside the caption "Madam President" on the cover and sent them to stores. Following Donald Trump's upset victory, they quickly corrected the error.

In the 2017 United States Senate special election in Alabama, the One America News Network declared Roy Moore the victor based upon their own unofficial polling, projecting him to win by a large margin, when he would, in fact, lose the election to Doug Jones.

In reporting on the 2018 United States House of Representatives elections, the Associated Press initially made a projection that California Republican David Valadao had won reelection to the House. They retracted this projection. When the results were fully counted, Valadao lost to TJ Cox.

References

External links

 "Behind the picture:'Dewey Defeats Truman'", life.com "Tru History: November 2, 2015", trumanlibraryinstitute.org''

Chicago Tribune
Headlines
1948 United States presidential election
1948 works
Harry S. Truman
American political catchphrases
1940s photographs
Black-and-white photographs
1940s neologisms
November 1948 events in the United States